Li Sung-Il is a male North Korean former international table tennis player.

He won a bronze medal at the 1993 World Table Tennis Championships in the mixed doubles with Yu Sun-bok.

See also
 List of table tennis players

References

North Korean male table tennis players
Living people
World Table Tennis Championships medalists
Year of birth missing (living people)
20th-century North Korean people